Al-Ahram Hebdo is a French-language weekly newspaper in Egypt.

History and profile
Al Ahram Hebdo was established in 1994 by the Al Ahram publishing house which also owns Al-Ahram newspaper, an English-language version, and Al Ahram Weekly. The paper which is published weekly is based in Cairo.

Egyptian writer Mohamed Salmawy was the first of Al-Ahram Hebdo  editors-in-chief. Hisham Mourad also served as editor-in-chief. He was appointed to the post in January 2011. In June 2014, Fouad Mansour who was the managing editor of the magazine since 2003, was appointed editor-in-chief of the weekly. Fouad Mansour co-founded Ahram Online, Egypt biggest English language news website, with veteran Egyptian journalist and writer Hani Shukrallah in 2010.  

Dina Abdel Mooti Darwich, an Egyptian journalist who won the first Samir Kassir Prize in 2006 for an article written in Al-Ahram Hebdo, is among the founding team of the weekly.

See also 
 List of newspapers in Egypt

References

External links
 Al-Ahram Hebdo 

1994 establishments in Egypt
French-language newspapers published in Egypt
Newspapers published in Cairo
Publications established in 1994
State media
Weekly newspapers published in Egypt